Barry Alan Pederson (born March 13, 1961) is a Canadian former professional ice hockey centre who played twelve seasons in the National Hockey League between 1980 and 1992.  He finished second in NHL Awards Voting for Rookie of the Year in 1982 and was a two-time NHL All-Star.  He won a Stanley Cup in 1991 with the Pittsburgh Penguins.

Playing career
Barry Pederson began his Junior hockey career playing for the Nanaimo Junior A Clippers. Moving up to the Victoria Cougars
Pederson was then drafted in the first round (18th overall) by the Boston Bruins in the 1980 NHL Entry Draft after playing junior hockey with the Victoria Cougars. He would return for one more season in Victoria after being drafted, scoring 147 points in 55 games, and another five points in a nine-game stint in Boston.

He broke into the NHL in the 1981–82 season, setting Bruin rookie records for goals (44, which still stands) and points (92) and finishing runner-up to Dale Hawerchuk for the Calder Memorial Trophy as the league's top rookie. Included in his 92 points was a seven-point effort against the Hartford Whalers which also remains a Bruin rookie record. Pederson and star winger Rick Middleton had instant chemistry, and would be one of the league's most dangerous duos for several seasons.

In 1982–83, he finished with 46 goals and 107 points. He led the Bruins in assists and points, and finished fifth in league scoring (the only player in the top eight not to eventually make the Hockey Hall of Fame). In the playoffs, he would take his game to another level, as he and Middleton wreaked havoc combining for 65 points in just 17 games before losing out to New York Islanders in the conference finals. Pederson finished third in playoff goals and points despite not reaching the finals.

Pederson continued his exploits in 1983–84, posting 39 goals and 77 assists for 116 points. His assist and point totals again led the Bruins, and his point total placed him sixth in the NHL. His 77 assists were third in the league behind only Wayne Gretzky and Paul Coffey. He played in his second consecutive NHL All-Star Game, and was selected to represent Canada at the 1984 Canada Cup tournament that summer.

At this point Pederson, despite being only 23, was on par with players such as Denis Savard, Michel Goulet, Ron Francis and Hawerchuk, all of whom went on to the Hall of Fame. However, his career would take a turn in the summer of 1984 when he was diagnosed with a benign tumor in his shoulder. He returned for only 22 games in the 1984–85 season, posting 12 points, before a second, more serious surgery had to be performed on the shoulder. This procedure required the removal of part of his shoulder muscle, and forced him to miss the remainder of the season.

Pederson returned to Boston's lineup for the 1985–86 season, but did not perform at the level he had prior to his injury. He finished the season with respectable totals of 29 goals and 76 points, good for fourth on the team but a 40-point drop from his last healthy year two seasons previous. At the conclusion of the season, Boston GM Harry Sinden, traded Pederson to Vancouver Canucks for Cam Neely and Vancouver's first round pick in the 1987 entry draft, which the Bruins used to select Glen Wesley.

For the 1986–87 season, he finished with 24 goals and a team-leading 52 assists for 76 points, and was named Canuck MVP by both the team's media and fans. In 1987–88, he again led the team in assists with 52, and added 19 goals for 71 points. He remains one of only four players in Canuck history (along with André Boudrias, Thomas Gradin and Henrik Sedin) to record consecutive 50-assist seasons.

In 1988–89, Pederson slumped to just 16 goals and 41 points while missing almost 20 games due to injury. Dogged by comparisons to Neely, the Canucks dealt him to the Pittsburgh Penguins 16 games into the 1989–90 season.

Pederson would continue to struggle in Pittsburgh, finishing the season with just 6 goals and 31 points in 54 games between the Canucks and Penguins. Now primarily a utility player, he appeared in just 46 games in 1990–91, but was a member of the Penguin team that won the Stanley Cup Championship that year.

Released by the Penguins that summer, he signed with the Whalers but was released after only five games. He would re-sign with the Bruins. At the end of the 1991–92 season, he retired at the age of 31.

Trade for Cam Neely
In the summer of 1986, Pederson was a valuable commodity. Still just 25, he was considered one of the best young centres in the game. He had already posted two 100-point seasons, and was only two years removed from finishing third in the NHL in assists and sixth in points. To the offense-starved Vancouver Canucks, who were the third-lowest scoring team in the league the previous year, he looked like a saviour and had the added attraction of being a 'local boy' - while originally from Saskatchewan, he had played his junior hockey nearby in Nanaimo and Victoria from the age of 15 onward.

However, Boston management were convinced that, despite Pederson's age, his best years were behind him as a result of two surgeries during the 1984–85 season to remove a tumour from his shoulder. On June 6, 1986, the Canucks signed Pederson as a restricted free agent. Cam Neely was left unprotected by Vancouver and went to the Bruins along with a first-round draft pick in the 1987 NHL Entry Draft as compensation for Pederson. The ninth overall pick in the 1983 NHL Entry Draft, Neely's development had stagnated and he finished the 1985–86 season with just 14 goals. However, Boston coveted his size and toughness, and considered him a potential heir apparent to Bruin players of the past such as Terry O'Reilly and Wayne Cashman.

Neely scored 36 goals in his first year in Boston. The next year he scored 42 and was named a second team All-Star. By the 1989–90 season, he was the most feared power forward in the game, as respected for his natural scoring touch as for his ferocious fighting ability. While Neely's career was cut short by injury, he still registered three 50-goal seasons and was inducted into the Hockey Hall of Fame in 2005. At the same time, Pederson had two solid seasons in Vancouver, but his career went into a spiral afterward, becoming a marginal NHL player by the time Vancouver dealt him away. He registered less than 100 points past the age of 27, and was out of the game by 1992. Vancouver's poor season following the deal turned the draft pick into the #3 overall selection in the 1987 NHL Entry Draft, with which the Bruins selected Glen Wesley who developed into an All-Star defender for the Bruins, who would go on to a 20-year career.

Personal
Pederson was born in Big River, Saskatchewan and moved to Nanaimo, British Columbia, where he was raised.

Pederson and his wife Patricia have two children. The family resides in Swampscott, Massachusetts.

Pederson now serves as studio analyst for Bruins coverage for the New England Sports Network NESN and is a Financial Advisor for UBS Financial Services in Boston.

Awards 
BCJHL (Coastal) Second All-Star Team – 1977–78
WHL Second All-Star Team – 1979–80
WHL First All-Star Team – 1980–81
NHL All-Star Game – 1983, 1984
Stanley Cup Champion – 1991

Career statistics

Regular season and playoffs

International

Transactions
 December, 1985 – Missed majority of 1984-85 due to surgery to remove benign tumour from shoulder.
 June 6, 1986 – Traded to Vancouver by Boston for Cam Neely and Vancouver's 1st round choice (Glen Wesley) in 1987 Entry Draft.
 January 8, 1990 – Traded to Pittsburgh by Vancouver with Rod Buskas and Tony Tanti for Dave Capuano, Andrew McBain and Dan Quinn.
 September 5, 1991 – Signed as a free agent by Hartford.
 November 14, 1991 – Traded to Boston by Hartford for future considerations.

References

External links
 

1961 births
Boston Bruins draft picks
Boston Bruins players
Boston Bruins announcers
Canadian ice hockey centres
Hartford Whalers players
Ice hockey people from British Columbia
Ice hockey people from Saskatchewan
Living people
Maine Mariners players
Nanaimo Clippers players
National Hockey League All-Stars
National Hockey League first-round draft picks
People from Swampscott, Massachusetts
Pittsburgh Penguins players
Sportspeople from Essex County, Massachusetts
Sportspeople from Nanaimo
Stanley Cup champions
Vancouver Canucks players
Victoria Cougars (WHL) players
Canadian expatriate ice hockey people in the United States